Armando Bréa (31 December 1898 – 21 August 1986) was a Brazilian middle-distance runner. He competed in the men's 1500 metres at the 1932 Summer Olympics.

References

1898 births
1986 deaths
Athletes (track and field) at the 1932 Summer Olympics
Brazilian male middle-distance runners
Olympic athletes of Brazil
Place of birth missing